is a railway station in the city of Kaizu,  Gifu Prefecture, Japan, operated by the private railway operator Yōrō Railway.

Lines

Station layout
Mino-Yamazaki  Station has two opposed ground-level side platforms connected by a level crossing. The station is unattended.

Platforms

Adjacent stations

|-
!colspan=5|Yōrō Railway

History
Mino-Yamazaki Station opened on April 27, 1919.

Passenger statistics
In fiscal 2015, the station was used by an average of 141 passengers daily (boarding passengers only).

Surrounding area
 Ibi River

See also
 List of Railway Stations in Japan

References

External links

 

Railway stations in Gifu Prefecture
Railway stations in Japan opened in 1919
Stations of Yōrō Railway
Kaizu